Gen. John Lacey Homestead is a historic home located at Wycombe, Buckingham Township, Bucks County, Pennsylvania. It was built in six sections over 200 years, with the earliest constructed in 1755. The oldest section is a -story, random-fieldstone structure with a slate-covered gable roof.  Attached to it are two -story, fieldstone sections with slate gable roofs.  The fourth section is a -story, plaster-covered stone section.  The fifth section is a -story, enclosed porch with a shed roof. The sixth section is a -story, frame section with a gable roof.  It was the home of Revolutionary War General John Lacey (1755–1814).

It was added to the National Register of Historic Places in 1980.

References

Houses on the National Register of Historic Places in Pennsylvania
Houses in Bucks County, Pennsylvania
National Register of Historic Places in Bucks County, Pennsylvania